I (Originally titled as Kingston Wall) is the debut album from the Finnish group Kingston Wall.

This album was originally released under the band's own record label, Trinity, in 1992. It was also licensed and released in Japan by Japanese Zero record label. Both of these prints have been sold-out in the 1990s and are considered somewhat collector's items. The original Trinity print featured a psychedelic cartoon drawing inside the album cover booklet. The Japanese print included English lyrics in the jewel case insert booklet as well as Japanese translations of the lyrics.

In 1998, Finnish record label Zen Garden (later Sony BMG Finland) re-released the whole Kingston Wall discography as remastered versions along with a 2-disc limited print-version of each album which included a Bonus CD featuring rare/unreleased studio and live material. These 2-disc versions have also been sold-out and are considered collectibles. The album is still available as a remastered 1-disc version from Zen Garden (2006).

Track listing
All song written by Kingston Wall, except where noted.
1. "With My Mind" - 4:39 
2. "Used to Feel Before" - 4:02 
3. "I'm Not the One" - 3:43 
4. "Fire" - 2:58 (Jimi Hendrix)
5. "Waste of Time" - 6:26 
6. "Nepal" - 8:37 
7. "And I Hear You Call" - 4:55 
8. "Tanya" - 3:51 
9. - 16. "Mushrooms" - 21:09 
I Prelude 1:18
II On My Own 6:50
III The Weep 2:01
IV Mushrooms 3:04
V Circumstances 2:18
VI Captain Relief 2:15
VII More Mushrooms 2:07
VIII The Answer 1:16

1998 re-issue limited edition bonus CD
"Freak-Out Intro" (live) – 2:13 (Kingston Wall)
"Purple Haze" (live) – 3:43 (J. Hendrix)
"Call Me the Breeze" (live) – 4:23 (J. J. Cale)
"Rocky Raccoon" (live) – 3:44 (McCartney & Lennon)
"Western Plain" (live) – 1:10 (Lead Belly)
"Freak-Out Outro" (live) – 3:54 (Kingston Wall)

Live from Kingston Wall Freak-Out Club at Live Marathon, Helsinki, Autumn -91

Personnel
Petri Walli - guitars, vocals, mixing
Jukka Jylli - bass, backing vocals, Egyptian horn on "Circumstances"
Sami Kuoppamäki - drums, percussion
Tom Vuori - mixing
Pauli Saastamoinen, Robert Palomäki - remastering (1998 reissue)
Kie Von Hertzen - cover design, illustrations
Mark Flynn - Sound effects, rambling on "More Mushrooms" and "Circumstances"
Petteri Vilkki - technical support, colors
Joni Vihervä - photography

References

1992 debut albums
Kingston Wall albums